Love Survives is the third studio CD from the Nashville-based band Brother Henry.  Love Survives was not released on the Double Deal Brand Records Label.  Instead it was released in June 2007 by the band for free download on the internet with a higher quality CD available for purchase.

In an interview with Nashville's The City Paper, Brother Henry's leader and cellist, David Henry discussed the marketing strategy behind the release. "We're offering the CD as a free download for anyone who wants it on the Brother Henry Official Website", Henry said. "Our philosophy now is we want to create and expand our fan base, and we feel that anyone who's willing to download the CD will then want to hear those same songs in concert. It's our way of building our audience, without having to get involved in the huge money expenditures that you've have to do if you got involved with a big label."

"The big thing I think that's really happening now in Nashville is the feeling that it's really better to do it yourself or do it independently unless you really have a sweetheart deal", Henry said. "We'd think about it if a major label wanted to commit a half-million dollars in promotion and marketing to one of our projects. But otherwise, it doesn't make any sense to get involved with something where you may sell a few thousand copies and then have to divide any profits that you get. It used to be there were maybe three acts that were being groomed and courted at any one time by a label. Now there are at least 200 really talented groups that are handling their own musical business, working independently and building their own fan bases and audiences."

About the CD, Henry said, "It's more musically extensive and rigorous, especially some of the instrumental parts. We wanted to bring to this new disc some of the energy from some things we'd been doing for other projects." His twin brother who plays lead guitar, Ned Henry, commented to The Tennessean, "All four members write songs the band uses, and whoever writes it, sings it. There's not one focal person. Most bands tend to have one central character, and I feel like we contribute a bit more on an even level."

Brother Henry albums
2007 albums